Mjölby HC is a Swedish ice hockey club which has been playing in Division 1, the third tier of ice hockey in Sweden, since the 2008–09 season.

External links
 Official website
 Profile on Eliteprospects.com

Ice hockey teams in Sweden
Ice hockey teams in Östergötland County